Harold Arthur (21 September 1916 – 9 March 2006) was an Australian rules footballer who played with North Melbourne in the Victorian Football League (VFL).

Arthur, a centreman, made three appearances with North Melbourne in 1941 but then didn't play for the next two years due to the war. He returned to the team in 1944 but was unable to become a regular fixture in the side. In 1945 he won the Gardiner Medal, which was rewarded to the best and fairest player in the league seconds. The following year he began playing for Port Melbourne.

He was the uncle of Hawthorn premiership captain Graham Arthur and the younger brother of Alan Arthur, who played for Essendon.

References

External links
 

1916 births
2006 deaths
Australian rules footballers from Victoria (Australia)
North Melbourne Football Club players
Sandhurst Football Club players